Potti Prasad (born Kavivarapu Prasada Rao) was an Indian actor who predominantly worked in Telugu cinema. He was introduced to the films by Jandhyala. His notable roles include Chantabbai and Sagara Sangamam. He made his screen debut with Appu Chesi Pappu Koodu in a brief role as one of the two (the other being Padmanabham) prospective bridegrooms for Girija. He was bowled over by the magnanimity of Nagi Reddi and Chakrapani when he was paid Rs.1116/- for that one scene work. He was a friend of another comedian Raja Babu. They acted in stage plays together. His last film was Brundavanam (1992).

Career 
Prasad was a stage actor before making his debut into films. Appu Chesi Pappu Koodu (1959) was his first film as an actor. Chakrapani offered him a role in this film after watching his performance in a stage show in Madras. He continued acting in stage shows while trying to get chances in movies.

Filmography
He played the role of an editor of a weekly magazine in a comedy film Chantabbai starring Charanjeevi. This got him good popularity with audience. He also played significant role in award-winning film Sagara Sangamam as a domestic helper. In the film Hai Hai Nayaka, he played the role of an Avadhani who loses his mind after listening to foul words of his student. He plays a detective role in the film Babai Abbai starring Nandamuri Balakrishna. His last film was Brundavanam starring Rajendra Prasad.

List of films 

 Appu Chesi Pappu Koodu (1959)
 Pooja Phalam (1964)
Sri Sri Sri Maryada Ramanna (1967)
Ummadi Kutumbam (1967)
 Bhale Rangadu (1969)
 Bangaru Panjaram (1969)
Pelli Sambandham (1970)
Adrusta Jathakudu (1971)
 Kalam Marindi (1972)
Collector Janaki (1972)
Anta Mana Manchikey (1972)
Praja Nayakudu (1972)
Pandanti Kapuram (1972)
Dhanama? Daivama? (1973)
Devudamma (1973)
 Andala Ramudu (1973)
Manushullo Devudu (1974)
Tulabharam (1974) as Ramanatham
Galipatalu (1974)
Bangaru Manishi (1976)
Chanakya Chandragupta (1977)
Amara Deepam (1977)
Chiranjeevi Rambabu (1977) as Lawyer Dharmarao
Lawyer Viswanath (1978)
Dongalaku Saval (1979)
 Chandipriya (1980)
Kodalu Vastunaru Jagratha (1980) as Tabla Player
Madhura Swapnam (1982)
 Subhalekha (1982)
Pelleedu Pillalu (1982)
Korukunna Mogudu (1982)
Dharma Poratam (1983) as Sastry
 Mantri Gari Viyyankudu (1983)
 Nelavanka (1983)
 Sagara Sangamam (1983)
Shakthi (1983)
 Rendu Jella Sita (1983)
 Adavalle Aligithe (1983)
 Srivariki Premalekha (1984)
Sundari Subbarao (1984)
Rama Rao Gopal Rao a.k.a. Rao Gopal Rao (1984)
Babai Abbai (1985)
Kotha Pelli Koothuru (1985)
 Mayuri (1985)
Krishna Garadi (1986)
Karu Diddina Kapuram (1986)
Chantabbai (1986)
 Rendu Rella Aaru (1986)
Sakkanodu (1986) as Priest
 Shrutilayalu (1987)
Raaga Leela (1987)
Krishna Leela (1987) 
Manmadha Leela Kamaraju Gola (1987)
Dabbevariki Chedu (1987)
 Vivaha Bhojanambu (1988)
Chinnodu Peddodu (1988)
Trinetrudu (1988)
Bandhuvulostunnaru Jagratha (1989)
Hai Hai Nayaka (1989)
Chalaki Mogudu Chadastapu Pellam (1989)
 Neti Siddhartha (1990)
Police Bharya (1990)
Iddaru Pellala Muddula Police (1991)
 Aditya 369 (1991)
 Prema Chitram Pelli Vichitram
 Brundavanam (1993)

References

External links 

1929 births
1998 deaths
Male actors from Andhra Pradesh
Indian male film actors
Telugu comedians
Male actors in Telugu cinema
People from Krishna district
20th-century Indian male actors
20th-century comedians